The curelom and the cumom are "useful" animals mentioned in the Book of Mormon. According to adherents Members of The Church of Jesus Christ of Latter Day Saints, these animals are thought to have possible existed in North or South America. To non-adherents, these animals are solely creatures of the Book of Mormon.

The exact intended identity of these animals is not known. Joseph Smith, the reputed translator of the Book of Mormon, is not known to have elaborated on the subject of these animals. However, the animals have been a subject for discussion.

Reference in the Book of Mormon
The curelom and cumom are mentioned only once in the Book of Mormon. The reference occurs in the Book of Ether, which is purported to be a history of a nation of early Americans called the Jaredites who are said to have left the Tower of Babel and traveled by barge to the Western Hemisphere. There, according to the book, they made use of a number of animals, though whether they brought them over on their barges is unclear. The narrative reads as follows:

And also all manner of cattle, ... and also many other kinds of animals which were useful for the food of man. And they also had horses, and asses, and there were elephants and cureloms and cumoms; all of which were useful unto man, and more especially the elephants and cureloms and cumoms. 

Apologetic interpretation
According to Latter-day Saint belief, Joseph Smith translated the Book of Mormon from an ancient language. In this line of thinking, the words curelom and cumom were transliterated instead of translated, meaning that while the ancient word is roughly transmitted, the actual animal intended is ambiguous. The context may imply beasts of burden. Some members of the Church of Jesus Christ of Latter-day Saints have speculated about what the terms refer to, including:

An as yet undiscovered, probably extinct species.
Some other North/South American animal species with which Smith was unfamiliar with including possible beasts of burden such as the llama, tapir, guanaco, or other possibly useful creatures like the alpaca, vicuña, jaguar, or monkey.

Mastodons, mammoths, or gomphotheres. Early Latter-day Saint apostle Orson Pratt might have identified cureloms as mammoths, though the context is unclear as to whether he is talking about cureloms and mammoths or cureloms as mammoths. If he means cureloms and mammoths separately, then he is not specifically saying that mammoths existed on the American continent at that time, seeing as all the animals are meant as hypothetical examples of what the Jaredites might have brought in their barges. 
"Now to prepare them against these contingencies, and that they might, have fresh air for the benefit of the elephants, cureloms or mammoths and many other animals, that perhaps were in them, as well as the human beings they contained, the Lord told them how to construct them in order to receive air, that when they were on the top of the water, whichever side up their vessels happened to be, it mattered not; they were so constructed that they could ride safely, though bottom upwards and they could open their air holes that happened to be uppermost" (Orson Pratt, Journal of Discourses 12:340).

Critical view of the mammoth theory
Mainstream paleontologists believe that mastodons and mammoths became extinct by 4000 BCE. This suggests that a beast of burden in the Book of Mormon time period most likely would not have been a mammoth, although many Latter-day Saints still persist in displaying cureloms as mammoths in literature and media.

Recent studies have found that a small population of mammoths existed until approximately 1650 BCE. These survivors were an isolated arctic population discovered on the remote Wrangel Island in the Arctic Ocean. This is the time period wherein Jaredites would have lived, but the geography and climate are far from matching the lands proposed by Book of Mormon scholars and apologists.

Cureloms and Cumoms in Latter-Day Saint literature
The curelom and cumom have appeared in Mormon literature. For example, Chris Heimerdinger, a popular LDS novelist, chose to make cureloms mammoths in his time-traveling adventure Tennis Shoes and the Feathered Serpent.  Similarly, Thom Duncan published an independent novel where an Indiana Jones-type character escapes from a curelom, described as a mammoth. In another book, titled Book of Mormon ABCs, on the third page it says, "C" is for curelom, and it has a picture of a mammoth.

In his novel The Memory of Earth, Orson Scott Card lists various pack animals: "horses, donkeys, mules and kurelomi". That particular spelling and similar alternative spellings of cureloms can be found in some non-English translations of the Book of Mormon, e.g. Slovenian.

Notes

References
.
.

Book of Mormon studies
Book of Mormon words and phrases
Criticism of Mormonism
Fictional animals
Mormonism-related controversies